From Here to Eternity: Live is a live album by English punk rock band The Clash. It was released on 4 October 1999 through Epic Records. The songs were recorded at different shows. Some of the recordings featured also appear in the film Rude Boy. "London's Burning", "What's My Name" and "I Fought the Law" were instrumentally overdubbed to repair some technical deficiencies of the original live recording.

Track listing

Personnel
 Mick Jones – lead guitar, vocals
 Paul Simonon – bass guitar, backing vocals, lead vocals and rhythm guitar on "The Guns of Brixton"
 Joe Strummer – lead vocals, rhythm guitar, bass guitar on "The Guns of Brixton"
 Topper Headon – drums 1978 – 81
 Terry Chimes – drums 1982

Additional performers
 Micky Gallagher – organ on "Armagideon Time"
 Mikey Dread – additional vocals on "Armagideon Time"

Production
 The Clash – producers
 Crispin Murray – engineer
 Adrian Hall; Matt Lawrence; Gareth Ashton – assistant engineers
 Bill Price – mixing
 Tim Young – mastering
 Model Solutions – cover art
 Paul Simonon – art direction
 Solar Creative – graphic design
 Pennie Smith; Matthew Donaldson; Adrian Brown – photography

Album notes
The liner notes also list a thanks to Rob Stringer, Hugh Attwooll, Paul Bursche, Matt Reynolds, Bruce Dickinson, Jock Elliot, Pennie Smith, Ollie Weait. "Special thanks to everybody all over the world that wrote in with their stories and recollections."

Charts

References 

1999 live albums
The Clash live albums
Epic Records live albums